Bueng Yitho is a town (Thesaban Mueang) located in the Thanyaburi District (Amphoe) of Pathum Thani Province in the Bangkok Metropolitan Region of Central Thailand. In 2018, it had a total population of 32,321 people.

References

Populated places in Pathum Thani province